MTV is a 24-hour general entertainment channel specialising in music and youth culture programming which serves Australia and New Zealand. It is operated by parent company Paramount Networks UK & Australia headquartered in London with a local office at Network 10's headquarters in Sydney.

History

MTV on the Nine Network
The "MTV" brand was launched in Australia during April 1987 as a music program that aired late on Friday and Saturday nights for its full six-year run on the free-to-air Nine Network. The program was hosted by Richard Wilkins and Joy Smithers with music news from Alison Drower. Its competitors at the time were ABC TV's Rage (which also started in April 1987) and Network Ten's Video Hits (which started in February 1987).

MTV Australia's focus was predominantly on Australian, British, Canadian and American artists and the program rarely played other forms of rock and pop music. The program presented a mixture of music videos, interviews and segments, and depended heavily on imported US content. In its early years it also showed the MTV USA game show Remote Control.

The program was discontinued in 1993 when Nine chose not to renew the licence with Viacom. Nine said the axing was due to high production and licensing costs. Saul Shtein brought MTV to Australia with Richard Wilkins.

ARC Music Television

"ARC Music Television", owned by Austereo, was launched three years after MTV ended on the Nine Network on 14 June 1996 in a joint venture with, then, music giant Austereo and Village Roadshow through Optus Television to become a twenty-four-hour music channel playing pop music and airing original programming. After a year on the air the network was approached by MTV Networks in the US and through a deal once again with Austereo, Village Roadshow Entertainment and Optus vision ARC was re-branded as MTV Australia.

Re-launch and expansion
Five months after the initial announcement of ARC's re-branding, MTV Australia was officially re-launched on Optus Television on 20 March 1997. The channel originally produced local programmes but due to cost cutting the channel aired mostly American content.

In December 2002 MTV was added to the Foxtel platform and was added in 2004 to the Austar platform. In the same year the channel set up MTV Networks Australia, which began work on launching its own original programming with the launch of the Australian version of the hit American show TRL on 10 September 2004 with host Kyle Sandilands from 2day fm. MTV Networks Australia launched sister channel Vh1 on 14 March 2004 when cable company Foxtel launched its digital network.
In 2005 MTV premiered more original programming with MTV Full Tank and on 3 March MTV launched the first inaugural MTV Australia Video Music Awards at Luna Park's Big Top with hosts The Osbournes. In April 2006 SelecTV began carrying the channel. At the end of 2006 it was announced that MTV would premiere its latest original show, MTV's The Lair which premiered on 26 January 2007 and is aired live every Thursday at The Metro Theatre. In the mid to late 2000s MTV Network took ownership of the channel from Optus. At the beginning of 2007 MTV re-located its head office from Ryde to Yurong St in East Sydney. In April MTV Networks Australia launched TMF Australia on the Optus Cable Service. In February 2010 it was announced that MTV would replace sister channel VH1 with MTV Classic which launched on 1 May 2010. On the eve of the launch for MTV Classic a spokesperson for MTV Australia announced that a third channel would be launched later in 2010. It was later revealed on 20 September 2010 that MTV would launch three new channels in Australia; MTV Hits, MTVN Live and MTVN Live HD. MTV Hits will play music 24 hours a day and MTVN Live will have concerts and festivals from around the world as well as documentaries. The channel's are set to launch on 1 November 2010. As part of expanding its local programming, MTV Australia announced its first reality series Freshwater Blue which follows the lives of twelve Australian teenagers in the Northern Beaches suburb of Freshwater.

2010–present
In June 2010 the channel became available on the new FetchTV service. In 2010 the MTV Australia and MTV New Zealand feeds were merged and the combined MTV Australia and New Zealand began broadcasting out of the network's Sydney offices.

As of Autumn 2013, Viacom International Media Networks in Sydney has relocated its MTV (for Australia and New Zealand) and Comedy Central (New Zealand) channels to VIMN in London. The channels advertising department will remain in Sydney for the time being.

On 17 September 2019, it was reported that sister channel Network 10 would launch a free-to-air MTV Australia in the coming months. A further announcement was made in May 2020 regarding a fourth multichannel from Network 10, which is expected to feature content from the back catalogue of ViacomCBS properties such as MTV and Nickelodeon. This was confirmed by the network on 13 July 2020, with the new channel launching as 10 Shake in September 2020. It will air kids content, primarily from Nickelodeon, from 6am to 6pm, with MTV, Comedy Central and CBS programming targeting young adults and adolescents airing from 6pm onwards.

Presenters and VJ's

Current VJs
Current presenters
Lisa Hamilton (MTV News, MTV TRL, Teen Mom Australia Reunion Special)
Kate Peck (MTV It Girls, MTV News, MTV Top 20)
Keiynan Lonsdale (MTV News Australia) 
Darren McMullen, 29. Joined in January 2007 as host of the live music show The Lair.
 Erin McNaught, 28. A former Miss Universe Australia, joined MTV Australia as a guest presenter in September 2009, before becoming a full-time member in December.
 Ruby Rose (born Ruby Rose Langenheim), 23. Was hired through the 2007 VJ search.

Past VJs

MTV on Channel Nine
 Richard Wilkins
 Joy Smithers

MTV on cable
 Jason Dundas, 23. Was hired through the 2003 VJ search. In 2007 he left the channel and joined the show Getaway on the Nine Network.
 Mike Fitzpatrick. Radio host of the Triple M breakfast show The Cage. In 1999 he hosted the Australian version of Video Clichés. Was also the host of Pepsi Taste of Summer in 2000 and fill in host of MTV Most Wanted.
 Christine and Sharon Muscat. Hosted Australia Top 30 Show.
 Kyle Sandilands. Radio host for the Austereo network. Originally joined in 2005 for TRL Australia. Later left the channel when he became a judge for Australian Idol.
 Lyndsey Rodrigues, 26. Joined MTV Australia in 2005. She left Australia in summer 2007 to temporary co-host the states version TRL. She was the permanent co-host of the USA version along with Damien Fahey.
 Ian Rogerson

Programming and schedule

Most of the channel's programming is sourced from MTV USA, MTV Europe and from other content providers within the Viacom/MTV Networks family. This includes entertainment programs popular in the US such as Pimp My Ride, Life of Ryan, Laguna Beach/The Hills, and Room Raiders. Frequently the channel features themed programme blocks and "marathons" on weekends, featuring an entire season of a particular show played over several hours.

Imported programmes

 16 and Pregnant
 Are You the One?
 Audrina
 Brothers Green: Eats!
 Catfish: The TV Show
 The City
 Disaster Date
 Ex on the Beach
 Friendzone
 Geordie Shore
 Jersey Shore
 Laguna Beach
 #mtvitgirls
 MTV's Bugging Out
 Pimp My Ride US
 Punk'd
 Ridiculousness
 Rob Dyrdek's Fantasy Factory
 Teen Mom OG
 Teen Mom 2

Defunct Local shows
 Fan vs. Band
 MTV News
 MTV's Official Motorola ARIA Chart Show
 MTV's The Lair
 My Pix
 Live @ the Chapel for Carlton Cold
 Vodafone Live at the Chapel
 Digital Lili
 MTV Full Tank (MTV New Zealand)
 MTV Mobbed
 MTV Most Wanted
 Scrambled Megs
 The Rock Chart
 TRL Australia
 Verushka's Closet

Availability
MTV Australia was originally only available through the Optus Television service (previously Optus Vision). This exclusivity deal was dropped in late 2002 and in 2003 MTV became available in a premium package on the Foxtel subscription TV platform. Around this time the channel also became available on the Austar platform.

Currently MTV is carried by all English-language pay TV providers. It is available as a basic channel on Foxtel, Austar, TransTV, Neighbourhood Cable and Fetch. On Optus Television the channel is available in add-on tiers. It was formerly available on SelecTV until the closure of its English service in late 2010.

Other projects

MTV Australia Awards

In 2005 MTV Australia launched the first ever MTV Australia Video Music Awards (Now known as the MTV Australia Awards), based on the VMA awards format used in Europe and the US. It was held at Luna Park in Sydney. Following suit with the location, the AVMAs had a circus theme and was hosted by various members of the Osbourne family. The awards ceremony included many international and local guests. In 2010 it was announced that MTV Networks Australia will launch MTV Classic. As part of the launch MTV will have a music event that will replace the annual awards ceremony for 2010.

Optus ONE80PROJECT
In a joint venture with Sony Ericsson and Optus, MTV launched the Optus ONE80PROJECT which was a competition for young writers, directors and producers to create a three-minute pilot and script to be aired on TV, mobile phone and internet. The prize was an opportunity to work with the MTV production team to create full-length dramas to air on the MTV Network. The entries opened on 11 September 2006 and closed on 24 November 2006 and the voting then commenced on 1 December 2006 and closed on 26 January 2007. The voting consisted of Viewers Choice and Judges Choice. The winners were announced on 7 February 2007 with The Viewers Choice going to Ben Briand for Hammer Bay and the Judges Choice going to Karl Mather and Zenon Kohler for Takoyaki City. In 2007 the competition ran again with the winners announced on 28 January 2008 at the ONE80PROJECT festival screening at Harmony Park in Surry Hills. The Viewers Choice Award went to Kade Robinson for Generation When and the Judges Choice went to Sarah Daggar-Nickson and Scott Otto Anderson for their co-production Dream Life. The 2008 competition is currently underway with winners to be announced early 2009.

Controversies

"Vote for Snoop" campaign
In 2007 rapper Snoop Dogg was to attend the MTV Australia Video Music Awards 2007 as a co-host on 29 April but a few days prior to the event it was announced that Immigration Minister Kevin Andrews would not grant him a Visa into the country because of past criminal convictions overseas. In response MTV Australia organised the "Vote for Snoop" campaign through MySpace which contained videos talking about how much he wants to become an Australian citizen in different situations.

Links with free-to-air television 
Occasionally Australian free to air television stations look at the success of shows on MTV before purchasing them for broadcast. In particular, Network Ten who purchased broadcast rights to The Osbournes from MTV Networks. Ten was required to wait until the show had aired on MTV Australia before broadcasting on their own channel. Later Ten purchased rights to Jackass, Pimp My Ride (but as of 2012, is being shown on 7mate) and Laguna Beach.

Public broadcaster ABC also purchased the rights to animation Daria, which formerly aired during its children's programming slot, edited for content. As of September 2016, Daria is airing on SBS Viceland.

As of 2009 programmes from MTV Networks are being screened on the Nine Network Channel GO!. The Hills is currently being broadcast on the channel.

In late 2011, Network Ten bought the rights to air Geordie Shore on its channel for free to air television. It started airing on its digital channel "Eleven" in 2012 and continues to air as of 2013.

As of December 2019, Network 10 is now a sister operation to MTV, following the 2019 merger of CBS and Viacom.

Website 
The MTV Australia website has had a turbulent past. It was originally hosted without a domain name by Village Roadshow. It gained a domain name in 1998 as mtv.com.au. The website was very basic and only included information about MTV Unplugged and the American VMAs. In 1999 the website seemed to have been abandoned completely. In 2000 the website simply redirected to the American MTV site before the domain expired and was locked by a holding company. With MTV's expansion in 2003 the site was revived but pointed towards the MTV Asia Awards. A proper MTV Australia website was launched in 2004 and has since gone through several redesigns. Mini sites for TRL Australia and the AVMAs were also set up.

The site was redesigned in 2007 and free broadband video channel MTV Overdrive launched on 19 April 2007 to coincide with the MTV Australia Video Music Awards 2007, which the Overdrive Channel is only available throughout the territory.

In 2009 the website was re-designed and now mimics mtv.com

Spin Off Channels 
Current channels: 
CMT Australia,
Comedy Central Australia,
MTV Classic/MTV 80s,
Club MTV,
MTV Hits,
Nickelodeon,
Nick Jr.,
NickMusic, 
Spike, 
Ten Network Holdings

Defunct/rebranded channels:
MTV Live HD,
MTV Dance (relaunched as Club MTV),
MTV Music, (relaunched as MTV Hits),
VH1 (replaced by MTV Classic)

Logos

See also
 MTV Australia Video Music Awards
 Nickelodeon Australia
 TMF Australia
 MTV Classic Australia

References

External links
 Official site
 Access All Areas.net.au MTV Australian Video Music Awards Coverage News, Photos, Reviews & all things MTV Awards!
 ARC Music Channel Promos

MTV channels
Television channels and stations established in 1996
English-language television stations in Australia
Music video networks in Australia
Television channel articles with incorrect naming style